Alcantarea (named for Dom Pedro d'Alcântara, second Emperor of Brazil) is related to the genus Vriesea of the botanical family Bromeliaceae, subfamily Tillandsioideae.

Species

References

External links
FCBS Alcantarea Photos
BSI Genera Gallery photos

 
Bromeliaceae genera